Get Up is a 2008 South Korean television film on the educational problems of adolescents in schools. It starred Lee Min-ho, Rhyme, and Lee Ah-jin.

Synopsis
High school students Min Wook-gi (Lee Min-ho) and Doo-heon (Rhyme) both land in trouble after they get into a fight. Doo-heon gets suspended, and Wook-gi has to clean his teacher's (Gi Ju-bong) car as punishment. While he's cleaning, his girlfriend Chura (Choi Ah-jin) shows up to tell him she's going on a ski trip with her new boyfriend. To chase after his girlfriend, Wook-gi tries to steal his teacher's car – but he can't drive. As he's making a run for it, Doo-heon happens to pass by on his motorcycle, and the two end up hitting the open road together.

Cast
 Lee Min-ho as Min Wook-gi
 Rhyme as Lee Doo-heon
 Lee Ah-jin as Joo-won
 Gi Ju-bong
 Lee Doo-il
 Nam Kyeong-eup

References

External links
 

2008 in South Korean television
Korean-language television shows
South Korean teen dramas